The 12th National Film Awards, then known as State Awards for Films, presented by Ministry of Information and Broadcasting, India to felicitate the best of Indian Cinema released in 1964. Ceremony took place at Vigyan Bhavan, New Delhi on 31 May 1965 and awards were given by then Governor of Maharashtra, P. V. Cherian.

Starting with 12th National Film Awards, a new award was introduced at All India level for Best Story Writer. Also awards for films made in English and Kashmiri language are also considered for the President's Silver Medal for Best Feature Film in the respective language at the regional level.

Awards 

Awards were divided into feature films and non-feature films.

President's Gold Medal for the All India Best Feature Film is now better known as National Film Award for Best Feature Film, whereas President's Gold Medal for the Best Documentary Film is analogous to today's National Film Award for Best Non-Feature Film. For children's films, Prime Minister's Gold Medal is now given as National Film Award for Best Children's Film. At the regional level, President's Silver Medal for Best Feature Film is now given as National Film Award for Best Feature Film in a particular language. Certificate of Merit in all the categories is discontinued over the years.

Feature films 

Feature films were awarded at All India as well as regional level. For 12th National Film Awards, a Bengali film Charulata won the President's Gold Medal for the All India Best Feature Film. Following were the awards given:

All India Award 

For 12th National Film Awards, none of the films were awarded from Children's Films category as no film was found to be suitable. Following were the awards given in each category:

Regional Award 

The awards were given to the best films made in the regional languages of India. With 12th National Film Awards, two more awards were introduced for the feature films made in English and Kashmiri language. These newly introduced categories includes President's Silver Medal for Best Feature Film and Certificate of Merit for second and third best film, although former was not given as no film was found suitable for the award.

Non-Feature films 

Non-feature film awards were given for the documentaries, educational films and film strips made in the country. For 12th National Film Awards, no award was given in the filmstrip category and only Certificate of Merit was awarded for Educational Films. Following were the awards given for the non-feature films category:

Documentaries

Educational films

Awards not given 

Following were the awards not given as no film was found to be suitable for the award:
 Prime Minister's Gold Medal for the Best Children's Film
 Prime Minister's Gold Medal for the Best Educational Film

References

External links 
 National Film Awards Archives
 Official Page for Directorate of Film Festivals, India

National Film Awards (India) ceremonies
1965 film awards
1965 in Indian cinema